Arath may refer to the following :

 Places and jurisdictions 
 Arathia, an Ancient city and bishopric in Cappadocia (Asia Minor), now a Latin Catholic titular see.
 Arath, Iran, a village in Iran
 Persons
 Arath de la Torre (b. 1975), Mexican actor